The 2001 NCAA men's volleyball tournament was the 32nd annual tournament to determine the national champion of NCAA men's collegiate indoor volleyball. The single elimination tournament was played at The Pyramid in Long Beach, California during May 2001.

BYU defeated UCLA in the final match, 3–0 (30–26, 30–26, 32–30), to win their second national title. The Cougars (23–4) were coached by Carl McGown.

BYU's Mike Wall was named the tournament's Most Outstanding Player. Wall, along with five other players, comprised the All-Tournament Team.

Qualification
Until the creation of the NCAA Men's Division III Volleyball Championship in 2012, there was only a single national championship for men's volleyball. As such, all NCAA men's volleyball programs, whether from Division I, Division II, or Division III, were eligible. A total of 4 teams were invited to contest this championship.

Format 
The rules were modified this year so that teams needed to score 30 points, rather than 15, to win each individual set. However, teams still needed to win three sets, of five, to win each match.

Tournament bracket 
Site: The Pyramid, Long Beach, California

All tournament team 
Mike Wall, BYU (Most outstanding player)
Hector Lebron, BYU
Joaquin Acosta, BYU
Scott Morrow, UCLA
Adam Naeve, UCLA
 Jose Quinones, Penn State

See also 
 NCAA Men's National Collegiate Volleyball Championship
 NCAA Women's Volleyball Championships (Division I, Division II, Division III)

References

2001
NCAA Men's Volleyball Championship
NCAA Men's Volleyball Championship
2001 in sports in California
Volleyball in California